Waterperry Gardens are gardens with a museum in the village of Waterperry, near Wheatley, east of Oxford in Oxfordshire, England.

Description 
Beatrix Havergal (1901–1980) established in 1932 the Waterperry School of Horticulture, a school of horticulture for ladies, that continued until her retirement in 1971. The story of the Waterperry school is told in the book Waterperry: A Dream Fulfilled by Ursula Maddy. The Waterperry estate provided Royal Sovereign strawberries to Buckingham Palace and the Chelsea Flower Show.

In 1972 the School of Economic Science purchased the Waterperry Estate, including Waterperry Gardens, which it continues to run to generate revenue for the school.

There are eight acres of landscaped ornamental gardens with an alpine garden, formal knot garden, herbaceous borders, riverside walk, rose garden, and water-lily canal. There are also five acres of orchards, and two collections of saxifrages which are accredited with Plant Heritage under the National Plant Collection scheme.

The gardens are considered notable for the broad variety of snowdrops that grow in the spring.

The Museum of Rural Life is housed in an 18th-century granary building, with displays of implements and tools. Other facilities include a gallery, garden shop, gift shop, museum, plant centre, and tea shop.

The music video to the song "Yesterday" by artist Natalie Shay was filmed at Waterperry Gardens.

Since 2017 the Waterperry Opera Festival has taken place in the grounds and the house. Over 4,000 patrons attended their 10-day festival in August 2022.

Notable alumnae 
 Mary Spiller, teacher at the school, presenter of Gardeners' Question Time
 Pamela Schwerdt, joint head gardener at Sissinghurst Castle Garden
 Valerie Finnis, specialist in alpine plants

See also
 List of museums in Oxfordshire
 Museum of Oxford

References

External links
 Waterperry Gardens website

1932 establishments in England
Gardens in Oxfordshire
Museums with year of establishment missing
History museums in Oxfordshire
Rural history museums in England